Cotman is the surname of the following people:

Aljaž Cotman (born 1994), Slovenian football goalkeeper
Carl Cotman, American neurologist and neuroscientist
 A British family of artists
 John Sell Cotman (1782–1842), English marine and landscape painter, etcher, illustrator and author 
 Miles Edmund Cotman (1810–1858), English artist, son of John Sell 
 John Joseph Cotman (1814–1878), English landscape painter, son of John Sell 
 Thomas Cotman (1847–1925), English architect and painter , nephew of John Sell
 Frederick George Cotman (1850–1920), English landscape and portrait artist, nephew of John Sell and brother of Thomas Cotman

English-language surnames